Graceton is an unincorporated community in Lake of the Woods County, Minnesota, United States.

The community is located west of Baudette on Minnesota Highway 11 at the intersection with Lake of the Woods County Road 4. It once had a station on the Canadian Pacific line, but is now a whistle stop.

Graceton was largely burned to the ground in the Baudette Fire of 1910.

References

Further reading
Rand McNally Road Atlas - 2007 edition - Minnesota entry
Official State of Minnesota Highway Map - 2007/2008 edition

Unincorporated communities in Minnesota
Unincorporated communities in Lake of the Woods County, Minnesota